Blackjack is a video game simulation of blackjack programmed by Bob Whitehead and published by Atari, Inc. for its Video Computer System (later known as the Atari 2600). The game was one of the nine launch titles available when the Atari 2600 went on sale in September 1977. The objective is identical to the card game: to beat the dealer's card total, without going over 21, to win a bet. One to three players play the computer dealer.

Gameplay

The player uses the paddle controller to enter a bet of up to 25 chips from an initial stack of 200. An up card is then presented, and the player decides whether to "hit" (accept another card) or stand. The player breaks the bank by obtaining a score of 1,000 chips, or is "busted" upon losing everything.

Due to a glitch in the program, while a player is selecting among the options of what to do with the current hand by pressing left or right with the paddle controller, the amount of the player's next bet is modified even though it is defined by a variable that will not be visible until the end of the hand, requiring the player to carefully re-enter it at the start of every hand without pressing the button carelessly or risk wagering an unintended amount.

Reception
Blackjack was reviewed favorably in Video magazine as part of a general review of the Atari VCS. It was described as "a good game for adults with several variations for single or double players", and was scored a 10 out of 10.

See also

List of Atari 2600 games
Casino, another Atari 2600 card game

References

External links
Blackjack at Atari Mania

1977 video games
Atari games
Atari 2600 games
Atari 2600-only games
Blackjack video games
North America-exclusive video games
Multiplayer and single-player video games
Video games developed in the United States